Peter Paul House is a historic home located near Dayton, Rockingham County, Virginia. It was built about 1810, and is a two-story, two bay, stuccoed Rhenish Plan log dwelling.  It has a gable roof and rubble limestone chimney.  A three bay brick ell was added about 1829.  It is one of a small group of Continental farmhouses surviving as relics of the heavy Swiss and German settlement in the Shenandoah Valley.

It was listed on the National Register of Historic Places in 1979.

References

German-American culture in Virginia
Houses on the National Register of Historic Places in Virginia
Houses completed in 1810
Houses in Rockingham County, Virginia
National Register of Historic Places in Rockingham County, Virginia
Swiss-American culture in Virginia